Natick (YTB-760) was the lead ship of United States Navy  large district harbor tugs.  The second U.S. Navy ship to carry that name, she is named for Natick, Massachusetts.

Construction

The contract for Natick was awarded 29 June 1960. She was laid down on 1 September 1960 at Slidell, Louisiana, by Southern Shipbuilding Corp and launched 19 June 1961.

Operational history

From 1961 to 1964 Natick served the 5th Naval District, Norfolk, Virginia. From 1964 into 1970 the tug was assigned to SUBRON 14 at Holy Loch, Scotland. Natick supported U.S. Navy ships at La Maddalena, Italy from 1970 to 1973. In the late 1990s, YTB-760 was stationed with Port Services supporting  at La Maddelena, Sardinia, Italy.

Stricken from the Navy list on 28 March 2003, Natick was sold at Boston, Massachusetts, on 26 April 2005 to Burnham Associates, Inc. of Salem, Massachusetts. She currently is in operation engaged in private marine commerce and has received ABS Loadline certification as of June, 2017.

References

External links
 

Natick-class large harbor tugs
Ships built in Slidell, Louisiana
1961 ships